Oswald Junkes (13 June 1921 – 2 November 1993) was a German weightlifter. He competed in the men's featherweight event at the 1952 Summer Olympics.

References

External links
 

1921 births
1993 deaths
German male weightlifters
Olympic weightlifters of Germany
Weightlifters at the 1952 Summer Olympics
Sportspeople from Trier
20th-century German people